Glen Lyon is the fourth studio album by the Scottish Celtic fusion artist Martyn Bennett.  
It was released on 11 October 2002 on the Footstompin' label. The album includes a recording of Bennett's great-great grandfather Peter Stewart on wax cylinder, as well as many songs by his mother, Margaret Bennett.

Track listing
 "Peter Stewart, 1910"	 – 0:25
 "Buain a' Choirce" – 3:54
 "Suid Mar Chuir Mi 'n Geamhradh Tharram" – 2:36
 "Uamh an Òir" – 3:30
 "A Fhleasgaich Ùir, Leanainn Thu" – 1:43
 "Hò Rinn O" – 4:24
 "A Thearlaich Òig" – 3:00
 "Cumha Iain Gairbh" – 3:54
 "Hiùraibh ò, Ghràidh an Tig Thu?" – 3:17
 "Dh'èirich Mi Moch Maduinn Chèitein" – 4:20
 "Air Bhith Dhomhsa" – 2:25
 "Cumha Mhic Criomain" – 4:10
 "Òran nam Mogaisean" – 3:25
 "Fhir a' Leadain Thlàth" – 2:48
 "Griogal Cridhe" – 5:21

Sources and links
 

Martyn Bennett albums
2002 albums